Jan Ziobro (Polish pronunciation: , born 24 June 1991) is a Polish ski jumper, a member of the national team, a participant of the 2014 Winter Olympic Games, a bronze medalist at 2015 World Championship in team .

Personal life
Jan Ziobro was born in Rabka Zdrój, Poland and raised in Spytkowice. He has a sister and four brothers. His brother-in-law is former ski jumper Krystian Długopolski. Ziobro works as a painter for his family's furniture company, Meble Ziobro, which sponsors him and Czech Jakub Janda. In August 2013, he proposed to his girlfriend Angelika. Their daughter, Wiwiana, was born on January 16, 2014. On September 20, 2014, he married Angelika Kowalczyk in private ceremony in Spytkowice. In October 2016 his wife gave birth to their second daughter named Sonia.

Career
Ziobro made his first appearance in the FIS Ski Jumping World Cup on November 27, 2011, in Kuusamo.

2013/2014
He won his first World Cup event on December 21, 2013, in Engelberg, while his countryman Kamil Stoch finished second. On that day he also equaled the hill's record with his jump of 141 meters. A day later, Ziobro landed on the podium again, finishing third as Stoch won. It was the first time in ski jumping history that two Poles finished on the podium in two consecutive contests.

Ziobro competed at the 2014 Winter Olympics in Sochi. In the men's normal hill individual event, he finished in 13th place. He was 15th on the large hill and 4th in the team event.

2014/2015
Ziobro debuted in the World Championships 2015 in Falun, Sweden. He was 8th in the competition on the normal hill Lugnet (K-90). On February 28, 2015, Polish team in squad: Ziobro, Kamil Stoch, Piotr Żyła and Klemens Murańka achieved bronze medal of World Championships 2015 in team.

Olympic Games

Individual

Team

Jan Ziobro's starts at Olympic Games

World Championships

Individual

Team

Jan Ziobro's starts at World Championships

World Cup

Season standings

Individual starts

Victories

Podiums

References

External links
 

1991 births
Living people
Polish male ski jumpers
People from Nowy Targ County
Sportspeople from Lesser Poland Voivodeship
Ski jumpers at the 2014 Winter Olympics
Olympic ski jumpers of Poland
FIS Nordic World Ski Championships medalists in ski jumping
21st-century Polish people